Lipolysis-stimulated lipoprotein receptor is a protein that in humans is encoded by the LSR gene.

References

Further reading